The Enggano thrush (Geokichla leucolaema) is a species of bird in the family Turdidae. It is endemic to rainforests on Enggano Island off Sumatra in Indonesia. It has traditionally been considered a subspecies of the chestnut-capped thrush.

It is threatened by habitat loss.

References

Enggano thrush
Birds of Enggano
Enggano thrush
Taxonomy articles created by Polbot